Promyllantor adenensis is an eel in the family Congridae (conger/garden eels). It was described by Wolfgang Klausewitz in 1991, originally under the genus Bathycongrellus. It is a marine, deep water-dwelling eel which is known from the Indo-Western Pacific, including the Gulf of Aden and the Lord Howe Seamount Chain.

References

Congridae
Taxa named by Wolfgang Klausewitz
Fish described in 1991